Operation Jaguar was a military operation that took place in the Dhofar Rebellion. It involved a combined force of British SAS and the Sultan's Armed forces to get back control of mountains and establish a permanent base.

References

External links
Operation Jaguar at Britain's Small Wars

 Dhofar War Documentary featuring interviews with officers from Operation Jaguar
History of Oman
October 1971 events in Asia
1971 in Oman
1971 in military history